Paddy Breathnach (born 1964) is an Irish film director and producer. He directed Man About Dog, Blow Dry and Shrooms. He was also involved in the production of The Mighty Celt and Ape.

Filmography
 Ailsa (1994)
 The Long Way Home (1995)
 I Went Down (1997)
 Blow Dry (2001)
 Man About Dog (2004)
 Shrooms (2006)
 Freakdog (2008)
 Viva (2015) 
 Rosie (2018)

Awards and nominations
Breathnach received awards at the Thessaloniki Film Festival, the San Sebastián International Film Festival and the Bogotá Film Festival.  He won ADL Stand Up Award at Santa Barbara International Film Festival in 2016.

See also
 Breathnach

References

External links
 

Film people from Dublin (city)
Irish film directors
1964 births
Living people